Christian Härtnagel (born 20 July 1982) is a German businessman, and the former UK managing director of Lidl.

Early life
He was born in Bavaria (Bayern). He attended the Christoph-Jacob-Treu-Gymnasium from 1993-2002 (CJT) in Lauf an der Pegnitz, near Erlangen-Höchstadt.

He attended the Baden-Wuerttemberg Cooperative State University Loerrach in Lörrach, where he studied Economics.

Career

Lidl
He started at Lidl Germany in 2003. After 2009, he worked at Lidl Ireland, He moved to Lidl Austria GmbH (Lidl Österreich). Lidl opened in Austria in 1998, and now has around 200 outlets.

He became managing director of Lidl UK on 9 September 2017.

See also
 Jesper Højer, (Danish) chief executive of Lidl since February 2017

References

External links
 Lidl Austria

1982 births
Baden-Württemberg Cooperative State University alumni
German businesspeople in retailing
21st-century German businesspeople
German chief executives
People from Nürnberger Land
Living people